Treibball is a positive-reinforcement, competitive dog sport which originated in Germany and entered sanctioned competition in 2008. The dog must gather and drive large exercise balls into a soccer goal.

Eight balls of approximately 45–75 cm are set in a triangle formation, similar to billiards, with the point ball farthest from the goal. The object of the game is to get all eight balls into a confined space the size of a soccer goal within a set time period, usually about 15 minutes.  The handler may not move outside of an area that contains the left half of and several feet beyond the goal area.  The dog works in close cooperation with the handler, who is only allowed to use whistles, verbal or hand signals to direct his dog. No verbal or physical corrections are used in Treibball. The dog and handler must communicate effectively to herd one ball at a time into the goal. The dog and handler team are scored on cooperation and direction, within that fifteen-minute time limit, and can earn extra points or accrue demerits accordingly.

The balls have been referred to as "rolling sheep" in recognition that this sport stems from herding for dogs who do not have access to regular sheep.

History
Originating in Germany in about 2003, formal competitions were first held in 2008.  Treibball is thought to have started as a substitute sport for herding dogs who did not have access to sheep, but who require mental as well as physical stimulation.

External links
NATE - National Association of Treibball Enthusiasts (USA) 
American Treibball Association
Associazione Italiana Treibball

Dog sports